Gyebangsan is a mountain of Gyeongsangnam-do, located in southeastern South Korea.

See also
List of mountains of Korea

References

Mountains of South Korea
Mountains of South Gyeongsang Province